Sawyers Valley is sited on the Great Eastern Highway about 40 kilometres from Perth, Western Australia in the Shire of Mundaring.
The community began as a sawmill and railway siding to process timber from the forest surrounding the Helena River to the south. Local employment included forest and Goldfields Water Supply Scheme maintenance, small orchards, and the Midland Railway Workshops. The suburb's name comes from the occupation of many of the first European settlers to the area in the 1860s, who were sawyers working at the local saw-pits. The Sawyers Valley Tavern, which sits on the Highway opposite the Railway Reserve Heritage Trail, was first established in 1882 and the Sawyers Valley railway station was built in 1884.

Local activities
The Sawyers Valley township, situated on the north-east corner of Beelu National Park, has many active sporting and community groups, including the Sawyers Valley Voluntary Bush Fire Brigade and the Sawyers Valley Primary School.

The Railway Reserve Heritage Trail and the Golden Pipeline Heritage Trail pass through Sawyers Valley.

Notes

References

External links
 Sawyer's Valley on Geoscience Australia
 Mundaring and Hills Historical Society website

Suburbs and localities in the Shire of Mundaring
Suburbs of Perth, Western Australia
Darling Range